Capitalist mode of production may refer to:

 Capitalist mode of production (Marxist theory) 
 Capitalism#As a mode of production